Elia Bartolini (born 18 July 2003) is an Italian motorcycle rider, currently competing for QJmotor Avintia Esponsorama in Moto3.

Career
He started racing in national competitions in 2010, reaching eighth in the Italian SAV Championship, in 2012 he won the Regional Championship and the Marco Simoncelli Trophy in the same category. He then raced in CIV for four years, finally winning the title in 2021, closely beating Matteo Bertelle to the Italian crown.

Career statistics

Grand Prix motorcycle racing

By season

By class

Races by year
(key) (Races in bold indicate pole position, races in italics indicate fastest lap)

References

External links

2003 births
Living people
Moto3 World Championship riders
People from Cesena
Sportspeople from the Province of Forlì-Cesena